The Presbytery of Detroit is one of the Presbyterian Church (U.S.A.) Presbyteries within the Synod of the Covenant. It consists of 78 congregations in Southeast Michigan.
The headquarters of the Presbytery is located at 17575 Hubbell Street, Detroit.

References

Further reading

Presbyterian Church (USA) presbyteries
Presbyteries and classes